Rabbi Avraham Yaakov Finkel (1926 in Basel – 26 June 2016) was a noted author of English Judaica literature.

He was born in Basel, Switzerland and lived in The Hague, Netherlands until 1942, when he was deported to Bergen-Belsen by the Nazis. He resided in Brooklyn, New York until he died on June 26, 2016. He was 90.

He is the author of 19 books including "The Essential Maimonides", "In My Flesh I See God", "The Responsa Anthology", and "The Great Torah Masters", published by Jason Aronson. He has also translated Ein Yaakov: "The Ethical and Inspirational Teachings of the Talmud in one volume"; and : "Rav Chaim of Volozhin's classic exploration of the fundamentals of Jewish belief".

See also

References 

1926 births
2016 deaths
Dutch Orthodox rabbis
Religious writers
Bergen-Belsen concentration camp survivors
Dutch emigrants to the United States
Writers from The Hague
People from Basel-Stadt